Salda may refer to:
Salda, Burdur, a township in Yeşilova district of Burdur Province, Turkey
Salda, Estonia, village in Kadrina Parish, Lääne-Viru County, Estonia
Salda Lake in Turkey
Salda (Tagil), a tributary of the Tagil in Sverdlovsk Oblast, Russia
Salda (Tura), a tributary of the Tura in Sverdlovsk Oblast, Russia
 Salda (bug), a genus of bugs in family Saldidae